Ronald or Ronnie Jones may refer to:

Ronald W. Jones (born 1931), American professor of economics
Ronald Jones (musician) (born 1970), American musician, guitarist with The Flaming Lips
Ronald Jones (interdisciplinarian) (1952–2019), American artist, critic and educator
Ronald Jones (cricketer) (1938–2019), English cricketer
Ronald Jones (defensive lineman) (born 1981), gridiron football offensive lineman and defensive lineman
Ronald Jones II (born 1997), American football running back
Popeye Jones (Ronald Jones, born 1970), basketball player
Ronnie Jones (American football) (born 1955), American football coach
Ronnie Jones (singer) (born 1937), American soul singer
Ronnie Jones (politician) (born 1953), American politician in West Virginia
Ronnie Jones (bowls) (born 1931), Canadian lawn and indoor bowler

See also
Ron Jones (disambiguation)